Paxistima is a small genus of shrubs in the family Celastraceae containing two North American species.

Paxistima canbyi (Canby's mountain-lover) is an uncommon shrub native to the Appalachians and surrounding areas in the United States.
Paxistima myrsinites (Oregon boxleaf) is widespread across western North America.

External links
Jepson Manual Treatment: Paxistima

Celastrales genera
Celastraceae
Taxa named by Constantine Samuel Rafinesque